The Clark County Courier is a weekly newspaper published in Clark, South Dakota, United States. The newspaper serves the counties of Clark and Codington. It is published and edited by Bill Krikac and has a circulation of 1,880. The Courier is published on Wednesdays.

The first newspaper in Clark County, the Clark Pilot, was established by E.F. Conklin in 1880, nine years before South Dakota became the 40th U.S. state. The Pilot consolidated with another early newspaper, the Clark Review in 1887 and was published as the Pilot-Review. The Clark Republic was first published in 1901 with E.S. Ashley as editor. Its name was later changed to Clark Republic Courier in 1908 and to Clark County Courier in 1911. Two years later, the Courier was purchased by E.A. Silfies, who had originally come from south of Chicago. On May 14, 1925, a deal was struck between G.E. Morrison, then editor of the Pilot-Review, and Silfies in which Silfies became owner of the Pilot-Review which he consolidated into the Clark County Courier. 

Silfies and his son, Orval, continued to operate the paper until 1945 when it was purchased by B.W. "Jeff" Condit of Mayville, North Dakota, the Lum Brothers of Wahpeton, North Dakota and Wayne Peterson of Moorhead, Minnesota. In 1947 Condit and son-in-law Bert Moritz of Wahpeton bought out the other partners and continued to publish the Courier until 1957 when Moritz purchased Condit's interest. Dave Moritz entered a partnership with his father, Bert, in 1972 and in 1976 Bert's son Jim joined his father and brother in establishing the Moritz Publishing Co. to do job printing as well as operate the newspaper. Bill Krikac joined the newspaper staff in 1995 and purchased the newspaper in 2001. The job printing side of the business remained with the Moritz Publishing Co.

The first edition of the Clark County Courier printed by the offset method rather than by hot type was in August 1968. The newspaper is currently prepared at the office in Clark and then sent to the Ortonville Independent, a newspaper in Ortonville, Minnesota, for printing.

Long time owner attorney Ralph A. Dunham sold the newspaper in 1914 to concentrate on his legal practice. The newspaper's former editors and publishers, David and Bert Moritz, contributed information and images to the 2006 book, Clark County; Images of America: a history of American life in images and texts.

References 

Newspapers published in South Dakota
Clark County, South Dakota